WEEI-FM (93.7 MHz) – branded SportsRadio 93.7 WEEI-FM – is a commercial sports radio station licensed to Lawrence, Massachusetts, serving Greater Boston and much of surrounding New England. Owned by Audacy, Inc., WEEI-FM is the Boston affiliate for CBS Sports Radio, the NFL on Westwood One Sports, the flagship station for the Boston Red Sox Radio Network; and the radio home of Greg Hill, Lou Merloni, Christian Fauria and Jermaine Wiggins.

The WEEI-FM studios are located in Boston's Brighton neighborhood, while the station transmitter resides in the nearby suburb of Peabody. In addition to a standard analog transmission, WEEI-FM broadcasts over two HD Radio channels, and is available online via Audacy. WEEI-FM's weekday programming lineup is also regionally syndicated to a network of stations throughout New England, most of which use the "SportsRadio WEEI" franchised brand.

The sports format currently heard on WEEI-FM launched on September 3, 1991, on the former WEEI (590 AM). The call letters WEEI-FM, formerly on a station in Westerly, Rhode Island, were granted on September 21, 2011, as part of a call letter shuffle. The 93.7 frequency, established in 1960, has carried WEEI programming since September 12, 2011, and has been the primary station for local WEEI programming since October 4, 2012.

History

Early years
In the station's early days as WGHJ and WCCM-FM, 93.7 aired locally based programming that targeted Lawrence and other towns in the Merrimack Valley. In 1974, the station evolved into WCGY, an automated stereo top 40 and oldies station. With a stronger transmitter, it now branded as a full-market Boston station. The call letters were chosen with the owner in mind, as Curt Gowdy and his children owned and operated the station.

In 1983, WCGY flipped to an oldies format playing hits of the 1950s and 1960s. The station, however, did not perform well in the Boston ratings. Some early to mid 1970s oldies were mixed in by 1984, and by 1985, the 1950s music was gone. The station by then was called "Superhits WCGY". By 1986, the station leaned slightly toward classic rock while still playing mostly music from 1964 to 1974. By 1987, WCGY evolved to more of a classic rock format and held on to this format until 1994. From 1992 until its demise in 1994, they were called "Rock 93, WCGY".

Eagle 93.7 (1994–1999)
On September 30, 1994, after the station was sold to American Radio Systems, WCGY became 1970s hits-formatted WEGQ "Eagle 93.7", which then underwent many changes over its five-year existence. Initially, they played music from 1970–79, ranging from classic rock and pop, to disco, novelty and easy listening. As time went on, they added late '60s and early '80s music. The Lost 45s with Barry Scott was moved to WEGQ from sister station WBMX and became a Sunday night staple there before heading to WODS. By 1995, they also leaned toward classic rock. The station's morning show team, Karlson and McKenzie, are now on WZLX.

Westinghouse Electric Corporation, then-parent company of CBS Radio, announced its acquisition of American Radio Systems in September 1997. As the combined company would have controlled 59 percent of advertising revenues in the Boston market, as well as three of the top five radio stations, in April 1998 the Department of Justice ordered CBS to divest WEGQ, WEEI, WRKO, and WAAF (now WKVB), as well as KSD and KLOU in St. Louis and WOCT in Baltimore, as a condition of its approval of the merger. In August 1998, Entercom announced plans to acquire the four Boston-area stations, along with WWTM (now WVEI), from CBS for $140 million.

Star 93.7 (1999–2005) 
Shortly after the sale was approved, at 10:00 p.m. on March 31, 1999, after playing "You Can't Always Get What You Want" by The Rolling Stones, WEGQ began stunting with a loop of Prince's "1999". At 3:00 p.m. the following day, the station flipped to rhythmic adult contemporary as WQSX, "Star 93.7". The first song on "Star" was "You Dropped a Bomb on Me" by The Gap Band. The format consisted of 1970s and 1980s-soul music, dance music and rhythmic hit music. This format, however, didn't catch any fire in the Arbitron ratings, but did have a loyal audience and served a small niche in Boston. During 2001, controversial "Survivor" winner Richard Hatch was a morning host briefly.

93-7 Mike FM (2005–2011)
On April 14, 2005, at 2:00 p.m., after playing "Last Dance" by Boston native Donna Summer, WQSX became WMKK, with an adult hits format branded as "93-7 Mike FM". The first song on "Mike" was "Tessie" by The Dropkick Murphys. Inside Radio, a radio industry publication, released information that had this change not taken place, Infinity Broadcasting (as CBS Radio, the group that was prohibited from owning 93.7 itself back in the late 1990s, was known at the time) reportedly would have transformed either WBMX, WZLX, or WODS into Jack FM on April 15, 2005.

Following the Boston Red Sox victory in the 2007 World Series, the station re-branded itself as "Mike Lowell FM" after the third baseman for one day. Similarly, the station paid tribute to Michael Jackson in July 2009 by re-branding themselves as "Michael FM" and playing Jackson's songs for the afternoon on the anniversary of his death.

Sports WEEI-FM (2011–present) 
On September 8, 2011, it was announced that WMKK would begin simulcasting WEEI's sports radio format on September 12, 2011. The switch took place at 6:00 a.m. that day, after the station played Lynyrd Skynyrd's "Free Bird". On September 21, 2011, WMKK changed its call letters to WEEI-FM. On October 4, 2012, WEEI and WEEI-FM split the simulcast; the existing local programming and sports broadcasts remain on WEEI-FM, while AM 850 aired a redirection loop for one day before becoming a full ESPN Radio affiliate on October 5, 2012. J.T. The Brick's Fox Sports Radio program was added to WEEI-FM's schedule on May 6, 2013. (The program, along with other Fox Sports Radio programming, had moved from WEEI AM to WBZ-FM after WEEI began carrying a partial ESPN Radio schedule in 2009, but was dropped from WBZ-FM following the launch of CBS Sports Radio in January 2013). On August 20, 2013, WEEI-FM announced that it would no longer carry Boston Celtics broadcasts after being unable to reach a new contract with the team. In early 2014, WEEI-FM dropped Fox Sports Radio and began carrying NBC Sports Radio's overnight program, shortly after WUFC (now WMEX) dropped its affiliation with that network. SB Nation Radio's overnight show joined WEEI-FM's schedule in 2019, the move came after NBC Sports Radio eliminated its late night programming. SB Nation Radio was replaced by CBS Sports Radio later that year, after WBZ-FM dropped the latter network to rejoin Fox Sports Radio; Entercom had acquired CBS Sports Radio in its merger with CBS Radio.

The station's HD2 channel carries an active rock format branded as "WAAF", which is also broadcast on the HD2 channel of sister station WWBX. The format and WAAF call letters were formerly used by WKVB (107.3 FM) until its 2020 sale from Entercom to the Educational Media Foundation, with a simulcast on the two HD2 channels (WAAF, in turn, carried WEEI-FM's programming on its HD2). Until 2017, WEEI-FM's HD2 channel simulcast then-sister station WRKO, with WAAF being broadcast on the HD3 channel.

Following a long history of controversial on-air comments, WEEI-FM suspended its daytime live schedule on February 16, 2018, so all employees could undergo mandatory sensitivity training. The tipping point came when afternoon host Christian Fauria was suspended for five days after impersonating Don Yee, the agent for longtime Patriots quarterback Tom Brady, with a stereotyped Asian accent.

Teams on WEEI

Boston Red Sox
Red Sox broadcasts are a daily feature of the WEEI Red Sox Radio Network slate from March through October. Each broadcast consists of:
 "The Pregame Show" is recorded from an air studio inside Fenway Park next to gate C
 "The Inside Pitch", a segment with a member of the local sports journalism establishment;
 (optional) A pre-game interview with the general manager;
 The game intro itself, a compilation of great moments in Red Sox broadcast history;
 Joe Castiglione broadcasts the game itself, along with a rotating collection of other broadcasters and analysts, sometimes including on-air personalities from the station. Prior to the 2007 season, Castiglione was partnered with long-time co-broadcaster Jerry Trupiano. Prior to the 2016 season, Castiglione's partner was Dave O'Brien, who moved to the New England Sports Network to replace the fired long-time TV play-by-play broadcaster Don Orsillo.
 A post-game interview;
 Post-game statistics (called "totals");
 A highlights clip for those who missed the early part of the game;
 A roundup of out of town scores; and
 A signoff tag.

During game broadcasts, WEEI-FM is also made available through the Major League Baseball web site (for a fee), and (for home games) on XM Satellite Radio (as part of the standard service) for those outside the Boston listening area. The entire 162-game Red Sox schedule also may be heard on an extensive radio network throughout the six New England states. Many of the smaller stations have always aired the Red Sox Network regardless of what Boston station originated those broadcasts.

In 2006, the Boston Red Sox signed a 10-year radio deal with WRKO (also owned by Entercom at the time) for the broadcast rights for the 2007 through 2016 seasons, worth a reportedly $13 million a season. About 30 Red Sox games a season, including all games on Wednesday nights and all weekly day games were heard on WEEI as part of the deal. As of August 26, 2009, WEEI once again became the flagship station for the Red Sox. This occurred two weeks after the debut of competitor WBZ-FM "The Sports Hub" and was seen as a reaction, focusing all Red Sox games on one station, WEEI, rather than splitting them between the station and WRKO.

During a rain delay, Mike Mutnansky hosts a show called "Sox Talk", where he takes calls and texts while the rain delay is in effect.

Boston Celtics
Sean Grande hosted the Celtics Tonight pregame show before each Celtics game on WEEI-FM in addition to providing the play by play for the game. Cedric Maxwell provided color commentary during the broadcast. The broadcast duo called themselves "Grande and Max." John Ryder hosted the halftime show and the Celtics Rewind show following the game.

On August 20, 2013, Entercom announced that it had been unable to come to terms on a new agreement to air the Celtics for the 2013-2014 season. Celtics broadcasts then moved to WBZ-FM.

Programming

Daily shows
The Greg Hill Show: Featuring hosts Greg Hill, Jermaine Wiggins, and Courtney Cox. Cox joined the show July 19, 2021, replacing Danielle Murr. Produced by Chris Curtis and Chris Schiem.
Gresh and Keefe: Featuring hosts Andy Gresh and Rich Keefe, with appearances from Andy Hart and Nick “Fitzy” Stevens.
Merloni and Fauria: Featuring hosts Lou Merloni & Christian Fauria, and Meghan Ottolini.
Mut at Night with Mike Mutnansky, when not pre-empted by Red Sox games.
Evenings the station runs Red Sox First Pitch and Red Sox Review with Will Flemming before and after games.

Weekend shows
NFL Sunday — Runs on Sundays. The show is hosted by  Rich Keefe, Jermaine Wiggins, and Christian Fauria.
Tanguay and Hart — hosted by Gary Tanguay and Andy Hart.
Real Postgame Show — Hosted by Glenn Ordway, Steve DeOssie, and Fred Smerlas.  Runs after each Patriot game during the NFL season.
Fitzy and Mego — Hosted by Nick “Fitzy” Stevens and Meghan Ottolini
Ken and Curtis — Hosted by Greg Hill Show producers Ken Laird and Chris Curtis
The Live BP Show — Hosted by Rob Bradford and Steve Perrault
KJ and Barrett — Hosted by Brian Barrett and KJ Carson
The station also carries Sunday Night Football from Westwood One most Sunday nights during football season.

Former shows
Andy Moes Show (September 3, 1991–September 1, 1992): WEEI's first morning show following its switch to an all-sports format. It was hosted by Andy Moes, former co-host of the Joe and Andy Show on WROR. The show was cancelled after one year due to low ratings.
Doyle and Mustard Show (September 1992–July 1993): Replaced The Andy Moes Show as WEEI's morning program. It was hosted by veteran radio personalities Craig Mustard and Tom Doyle. It was replaced by the syndicated Imus in the Morning in July 1993.
The Janet and Glenn Show and The Glenn Ordway Show (September 3, 1991–June 25, 1993): 1-4 pm show created as part of WEEI's switch to an all-sports format. Co-hosted by then-Celtics announcer Glenn Ordway and public relations executive Janet Prensky. Prensky was fired by WEEI on September 4, 1992 and Ordway hosted the show solo until June 25, 1993.
The Craig Mustard Show (June 28, 1993–August 1994): Replaced The Glenn Ordway Show as WEEI's midday talk-show. Show ended after Mustard's firing from WEEI in August 1994.
Ted Nation (1992–September 2005): Aired weekdays 7 pm to midnight. Hosted by then-Boston College Eagles basketball announcer Ted Sarandis.
The Baseball Show (formerly Red Sox Baseball Today): Ran 9 am to noon on Saturday. Up until 2008, Steve Buckley of the Boston Herald and Sean McAdam of The Providence Journal served as co-hosts. In 2008, Buckley and McAdam alternated weeks co-hosting with Mike Adams. In 2009, the show began simulcasting on Comcast SportsNet New England with Mike Felger hosting with analysts Lou Merloni, Sean McAdam, and Steve Buckley. Greg Dickerson replaced Felger in July 2009 following Felger's move to WBZ-FM.  WEEI dropped The Baseball Show following the 2010 season; it will continue to air on Comcast SportsNet.
The Big Show (August 1995–February 15, 2013): sports talk radio program hosted by Glenn Ordway with various co-hosts and guests. One of the show's regular features was "The Whiner Line", which consisted of listeners calling in and leaving complaints on a voicemail system.
Kirk and Callahan — Featuring hosts  Gerry Callahan, Kirk Minihane, producer Chris Curtis and producer Ken Laird.  It has featured a variety of special guests during different parts of the year including Curt Schilling every Tuesday and Red Sox CEO Larry Lucchino every Thursday during the baseball season, as well as Tom Brady every Monday during football season. On February 21, 2013, it was announced Kirk Minihane would be the third host of "Dennis and Callahan", an equal voice. John Dennis had been a co-host but semi-retired in August 2016. Minihane departed the show on November 15, 2018, to finish out his Entercom contract under other arrangements, before moving to Barstool Sports in May 2019. Callahan left in July 2019.
Salk and Holley (March 19, 2013–March 12, 2014):  — Featuring hosts Mike Salk and Michael Holley. The show replaced The Big Show on March 19, 2013. Producers of the show were Andy Massua and Ben Kichen. Mike Salk left the station on March 12, 2014.
Mutt and Merloni (February 28, 2011–May 22, 2014): Featuring hosts Mike Mutnansky and Lou Merloni
Middays with MFB (May 27, 2014–July 30, 2015): Featuring hosts Tim Benz, Christian Fauria, and Lou Merloni
Planet Mikey with Mike Adams (December4–June 2016)
Dale and Holley with Thornton (November 17, 2014–November 18, 2016): Jerry Thornton departed on November 18, 2016, to rejoin Barstool Sports
Dale and Holley with Keefe (December 6, 2016–February 28, 2018): Michael Holley departed to join NBC Sports Boston full time.
Kirk and Callahan — Featuring hosts Gerry Callahan, Kirk Minihane, producer Chris Curtis and producer Ken Laird.  It has featured a variety of special guests during different parts of the year including Curt Schilling every Tuesday and Red Sox CEO Larry Lucchino every Thursday during the baseball season, as well as Tom Brady every Monday during football season. On February 21, 2013, it was announced Kirk Minihane would be the third host of "Dennis and Callahan", an equal voice. John Dennis had been a co-host but semi-retired in August 2016. Minihane departed the show on November 15, 2018, to finish out his Entercom contract under other arrangements, before moving to Barstool Sports in May 2019.
Mut and Callahan (November 15, 2018–July 12, 2019):  Featuring hosts Mike Mutnansky and Gerry Callahan.
Dale and Keefe (March 1, 2018–March 12, 2021):  Featuring hosts Dale Arnold and Rich Keefe. Holley replaced Bob Neumeier in 2005 and the show was renamed Dale and Holley from Dale and Neumy. The final Dale and Holley aired in the midday on February 23, 2011, but was then brought back officially on April 1, 2014, taking the 2-6 PM slot previously occupied by The Big Show. Rich Keefe joined as the third host of the show on December 6, 2016, from WBZ-FM. On February 28, 2018, Michael Holley announced that he had rejected a multi-year contract extension and would be leaving the show effectively immediately to focus on his TV career with NBC Sports Boston. The show aired afternoons from March 1, 2018, to August 10, 2018, before moving to middays on August 13, 2018. Arnold retired from WEEI on March 12, 2021.
Mustard and Johnson — Hosted by Craig Mustard and Larry Johnson, who of course won the 2019 Marc Morroso Annual Hotdog Eating Contest in Maine. The show was cancelled in 2008 but was renewed and the schedule will vary from week to week. The show is also nicknamed "Yankee Talk" because of the large number of Yankee fans that call into the show.

Hosts
Greg Hill - The Greg Hill Show
Jermaine Wiggins – The Greg Hill Show, NFL Sunday
Courtney Cox – The Greg Hill Show
Mike Mutnansky - Mut at Night
Glenn Ordway: Ordway, Merloni, and Fauria; Real Postgame Show
Lou Merloni - Ordway, Merloni, and Fauria; Part time Red Sox radio analyst
Christian Fauria - Ordway, Merloni, and Fauria; NFL Sunday
Andy Gresh – Gresh and Keefe
Rich Keefe – Gresh and Keefe, NFL Sunday
Patrick Gilroy - WEEI "Late Night"/Weekend
Rob Bradford – Weekend/Fill-in
Brian Barrett - WEEI "Late Night"/Weekend
Andy Hart – Weekend/Fill-in, Gresh and Keefe
Will Flemming – Red Sox Studio Host
Joe Castiglione – Red Sox play-by-play
Nick “Fitzy” Stevens – Weekend/Fill-in, Gresh and Keefe 
Greg Dickerson - Weekend/Fill-in
KJ Carson - WEEI "Late Night"/Weekend

Former staff

Gerry Callahan - Former co-host of Dennis and Callahan, Kirk and Callahan and Mut and Callahan (September 1997 - July 2019)
John Dennis – Former co-host of Dennis and Callahan (September 1997 - August 18, 2016)
Michael Holley – Former co-host of Dale and Holley with Keefe, Dale and Holley, The Big Show, and Salk and Holley. Now with NBC Sports Boston. (March 1, 2005 - February 28, 2018)
Kirk Minihane - Former co-host of Kirk and Callahan, Dennis and Callahan with Minihane. (2009 - November 15, 2018).
Michael Andelman: SportsRap (1994–1995)
Eddie Andelman: (1991–2001)
Michael Felger: (2008-2009) former Big Show co-host and fill-in host, now with WBZ-FM
Bob Neumeier: Dale & Neumy Show (2002–2005)
Ted Sarandis: Ted Nation (1992–2005),
Dave Shea: co-host on The Big Show (1995)
Jon Wallach: Dale and Holley flashboy, now with WBZ-FM
Jon Meterparel: Dennis and Callahan update anchor (2000–2012)
Mike Salk – Former co-host of Salk and Holley (March 19, 2013 – March 12, 2014)
Sean Grande – Former update anchor on The Big Show, Celtics play-by-play (1991-1998, 2007-2013)
Cedric Maxwell – Former Celtics color commentator (1997-2001, 2007-2013)
John Ryder - Former Red Sox/Celtics pre/post game host, Planet Mikey
Tim Benz –  Former co-host of Middays with MFB (May 27, 2014 - July 30, 2015)
Mike Adams—Former host of Planet Mikey (Dec 2005 to June 2016)
Jerry Thornton – Former co-host of Dale and Holley with Thornton (November 17, 2014 - November 18, 2016)
Lenny Megliola - Planet Mikey
John Tomase - Weekend/Fill-in, (January 2015 - March 2019)
DJ Bean – Weekend/Fill-in, WEEI.com Bruins beat writer, now with NBC Sports Boston.
Christian Arcand – WEEI Late Night/Red Sox pre and post host, now with 98.5 The Sports Hub.
Dave O'Brien – Red Sox play-by-play, current Red Sox television play-by-play for NESN (2007-2015)
Ty Anderson - Weekend/Fill-in, WEEI.com Bruins beat writer, now with 98.5 The Sports Hub.
Tim Neverett - Red Sox play-by-play (2016-2018)
Danielle Murr - The Greg Hill Show, co-host (July 29, 2019 - March 12, 2021)
Dale Arnold - Host, Various Shows (September 3, 1991 - March 12, 2021)

WEEI/NESN Radio-Telethon
Each year since 2002, New England Sports Network (NESN) and WEEI have teamed up to raise money for The Jimmy Fund by holding a Radio-Telethon. For two days every August the event is simulcast on WEEI and NESN. WEEI radio personalities conduct auctions and interviews with cancer patients and survivors, doctors, athletes and celebrities. Since 2002, this event has raised around $45 million for the Jimmy Fund and has received donations from all 50 states.

Simulcast network

A number of other stations in the New England region carry most of WEEI-FM's local programming.  The stations are branded as "Sports Radio WEEI", and many carry call letters similar to the Boston flagship station. Four of the eight network affiliates are directly owned by Audacy.

WEEI-FM's sports play-by-play broadcasts are distributed separately, though some games originated by WEEI may air on some of the other affiliated stations by way of a separate deal.  Some of the stations have picked up play-by-play rights in concert with WEEI after their conversion to the simulcast. Most stations carry either ESPN Radio or Fox Sports Radio when the flagship station carries games or when WEEI-FM is not airing local programming.

 Asterisk (*) indicates HD Radio broadcast.

Network formulation and past affiliates 
When WEEI (590 AM) formally relaunched as an all-sports station on September 1991, WEEI's then-owner, the Boston Celtics, signed a lease agreement with Zapis Communications to carry WEEI programming full-time on Zapis's AM station in Worcester, WFTQ. This arrangement replaced a previous simulcast of co-owned WAAF (107.3 FM) on WFTQ after Zapis shut down local operations earlier in the year; the WEEI simulcast on WFTQ commenced with the WVEI call sign. After Zapis sold the renamed WWTM to American Radio Systems along with WAAF in 1996, it reincorporated WEEI programming into its lineup in 1997, and in 2000 reclaimed the WVEI call sign. What is now WVEI-FM was acquired from Phoenix Media/Communications Group in 2004, and what is now WWEI was purchased from Vox Radio Group in 2006.

Entercom's initial plan to syndicate WEEI programming to non-Entercom stations was to place it on eleven New England stations owned by Nassau Broadcasting. The plan, announced on August 16, 2007, followed reports that Nassau was planning to use its WCRB (99.5 FM) as the flagship for a regional sports network featuring Dennis and Callahan, which was on hiatus from WEEI at the time during stalled contractual negotiations; the deal would have seen Entercom acquire a 50-percent interest in WCRB, which was to retain its classical music format, for $10 million. The Nassau-owned affiliates would not have aired Red Sox and Celtics broadcasts or Patriots Monday. The deal between Nassau and Entercom ended up collapsing by January 2008; one of the stations involved, WWHQ (101.5 FM) in Meredith, New Hampshire, joined the WEEI network as WZEI on January 4, 2013, after Nassau sold its stations.

The first of WEEI's eventual affiliates began airing its programming in September 2008.  WPPI, one of the first affiliates, initially carried WEEI programming (as WGEI) from September 2008 until April 2009, when it began simulcasting talk station WLOB; it rejoined the network in August 2011.  Additionally, WAEI (910 AM and 97.1 FM) in Bangor, Maine carried WEEI programming from September 2008 until January 2010, when Blueberry Broadcasting terminated its affiliation following a breach-of-contract dispute. WZEI left the network on July 1, 2020, when it became soft adult contemporary station WWLK-FM. WRCH-HD3 converted to a WEEI simulcast after WRCH's former owner, CBS Radio, merged with Entercom in mid-November 2017; the channel had previously simulcast CBS-owned WBZ-FM, which was divested to Beasley Broadcast Group.

References

External links

WEEI Network Stations; station map and list

Lawrence, Massachusetts
Sports radio stations in the United States
Radio stations established in 1960
Sports in Boston
EEI-FM
Mass media in Essex County, Massachusetts
Audacy, Inc. radio stations
CBS Sports Radio stations
1960 establishments in Massachusetts